Neal Matthews Jr. (October 26, 1929 – April 21, 2000) was an American vocalist who achieved fame as part of The Jordanaires, one of country music's premier backup groups; most notably with Elvis Presley.  Matthews played guitar, double bass, and bass guitar.

Biography

Born in Nashville, Tennessee, as the son of Neal Matthews Sr., Matthews served with the United States Army during the Korean War and received a Bronze Star. Following his discharge in 1953, he became a member of the Nashville-based singing group, The Jordanaires. Matthews developed the Nashville Number System for chords in music that was instrumental in creating the Nashville sound.

As a member of The Jordanaires, he worked with artists such as Patsy Cline, Red Foley, Johnny Horton, Ferlin Husky, Jim Reeves and George Jones. The group also served as backup vocalists for pop music artists such as Steve Lawrence and Eydie Gorme, Connie Francis and Julie Andrews. They are best known, however, as the backup vocalists for Elvis Presley for 15 years.

Matthews and the group also toured extensively around the world and recorded a number of their own albums, winning a Grammy Award for Best Southern, Country, or Bluegrass Album.
 
Matthews died of a heart attack at age 70 and was interred in the Woodlawn Memorial Park Cemetery in Nashville. He was survived by his wife (Charlsie Stewart Matthews), two children (Lisa Matthews Doster and Gregory Stewart Matthews), and two grandchildren (Matthew Thomas Doster and William Cole Doster).

As part of The Jordanaires, in 2001 he was inducted posthumously into the Country Music Hall of Fame.

External links
In Memory of Neal Matthews

1929 births
2000 deaths
20th-century American singers
United States Army personnel of the Korean War
Musicians from Nashville, Tennessee
20th-century American male singers
Country Music Hall of Fame inductees
The Jordanaires members